Mithila (also known as Mithilanchal, Tirhut and Tirabhukti) is a geographical and cultural region located in the Indian subcontinent. It comprises certain parts of Bihar of India and adjoining districts of the eastern Terai of Nepal. The native language is known as Maithili and its speakers are referred to as Maithils.
The majority of the Mithila region falls within modern-day India, more specifically in the state of Bihar.
Mithila is bounded in the north by the Himalayas, and in the south, west and east by the Ganges, Gandaki and Mahananda respectively. It extends into the southeastern Terai of Nepal.
This region was also called Tirabhukti, the ancient name of Tirhut.

Ancient history

The name Mithila is believed to be derived from the King Mithi. He established Mithilapuri. Since he was born out of the body of his father, he was called Janaka.

After this, the later kings of Mithila adopted the title Janaka. The most famous Janaka was Seeradhwaja Janaka, father of Sita. There were 52 kings in the dynasty of  Janaka.

The region was also known as Videha. The kingdom of Videha is mentioned for the first time in Yajurveda Samhita. Mithila, is mentioned in Buddhist Jatakas, the Brahamanas, the Puranas (described in detail in Brhadvisnu Purana) and various epics such as the Ramayana and the Mahabharata.

However, according to the Shatapatha Brahmana, a chieftain named Videgha Mathava migrated from the Saraswati Valley to Mithila during the Vedic period and established the Videha kingdom. This leads to confusion whether the Videha kingdom was established during the Vedic period or not, since one of the Janakas of Videha was also the father-in-law of King Rama, who ruled much earlier. Archaeological evidence is lacking to realistically assess the period of their migration.

A list of kings is mentioned in Mahabharata and Jatakas. All the kings either adopted the title Videha or Janaka.

Vedic period, Videha Kingdom

During the Vedic period, Mithila was the centre of the Videha kingdom.
The rulers of the Videha kingdom were called Janakas.

c. 600 BCE–c. 300 BCE, Vajji Mahajanapada

Following the fall of the Videhas, Mithila came under the control of the Vajjika League which was a confederacy of clans the most famous of which was the Licchavi. The capital was in the city of Vaishali in modern-day Bihar. Mithila under Vajji was eventually conquered by the king of Magadha, Ajatashatru.

6th century to 11th century: Pala and Sena rule

Mithila was a tributary of the Pala Empire for almost three centuries. The rulers of the Pala Empire were followers of Buddhism and according to some texts, they were Kayasthas. Their capital is believed to be located at present town of Balirajgarh (Babubarhi-Madhubani district). The last king of the Pala Empire was Madanapala. Madanapal was a weak king, as he was defeated by Samanta Sena's army, eventually leading to the establishment of the Sena Dynasty.

The founder of the Pala Empire was Gopala. He was the first independent Buddhist king of Bengal and came to power in 750 in Gaur by democratic election, which was unique at the time. He reigned from 750 to 770 and consolidated his position by extending his control over all of Bengal. His successors Dharmapala (r. 770-810) and Devapala (r. 810-850) expanded the empire across the northern and eastern Indian subcontinent. The Pala Empire eventually disintegrated in the 12th century under the attack of the Sena Dynasty.

Sena Dynasty belonged to Brahmakshatriya(The Brahmin who ruled as Kshatriya) according to their copperplates. They were ardent followers of Hinduism and hence, people of Mithila, themselves being followers of Hinduism, helped Samanta Sena in defeating Madanapala. Eminent scholar Vachaspati Mishra (from village Andhra Tharhi in Madhubani district) was from this period.

11th century to 14th century: Simroon/Karnata Dynasty

The Karnata or Simroon dynasty was founded by Nanyadeva with the capital being in Simraon in Mithila.

In the court of Hari Singh Deva the Royal Priest was Jyotirishwar, the author of Varna Ratnakar. Upon Ghiyasuddin Tughlak's invasion of Mithila (Tirhut), King Harisimhadeva , along with many Maithils, fled to Nepal and founded a new dynasty in Nepal.

The dynasty had six kings of note:

 Nanyadeva (Nanya Singh Dev) apart from being a great warrior, also had a keen interest in music. He classified and analyzed the Ragas and opines Madhya Laya is chosen for Hasya (humorous) and Sringar (libido) rasa, Bilambit is chosen for Karun (compassion) rasa and Drut is chosen for Veer (brave), Rodra (anger), Adbhut (marvellous) and Bhayanak (fearful) rasas. He wrote a treaty on music 'Saraswati Hridayalankar' which is preserved in the Bhandarkar Research Institute of Pune. Nanya Dev is also considered to be the "forgotten King of Mithila".
 Gangadeva (Ganga Singh Dev)
 Narasimhadeva (Nar Singh Dev)
 Ramasimhadeva (Ram Singh Dev)
 Shaktisimhadeva (Shakti Singh Dev)
 Harisimhadeva (Hari Singh Dev) was the most famous. He was instrumental in initiating and implementing Panji Vyavastha or Panji Prabandha in Maithil Brahmins and Maithil Kayasthas (Karn Kayasthas). He was also great patron of art and literature.

14th to 16th century: Oiniwar Dynasty

In 1325, following the collapse of the Karnat dynasty in 1324, Nath Thakur became the first Maithil ruler. The dynasty that followed from him was called Oiniwar Dynasty, and comprised a further 20 rulers.

When Akbar became emperor, he tried to bring normalcy to Mithila region. He came to the conclusion that only after a Maithil Brahmin was made King, peace can prevail and rent can be collected in Mithila. In 1556, Emperor Akbar declared Pt. Mahesh Thakkur as the ruler of Mithila. Pt. Mahesh Thakkur was of the mool, Kharaure Bhaur and hence that dynasty was called 'Khandwala Kul' and the capital was made at Rajgram in Madhubani District.

16th century to 20th century : Raj Darbhanga

The Khandwala dynasty ruled as the Raj Darbhanga, beginning with Mahesh Thakur, who died in 1558. The last ruler was Kameshwar Singh, whose reign from 1929 came to an end in 1947 with the independence of India, when all the kingdoms merged with Union of India.

References 
Notes

 The Maithil Brahmans - an online ethnography

Mithila
Culture of Mithila
Mithila Region, History
Mithila Region, History
.02
.02
Mithila Region, History
Mithila Region, History
Madhesh Province
Mithila
Mithila Region, History